Hereford Rugby Club is an English rugby union team based in Hereford, Herefordshire. The club operates four senior teams, a veterans team, a colts team and a full range of junior teams. The first XV currently play in the sixth tier of the English rugby union system in Midlands 1 West following relegation National League 3 Midlands at the end of the 2011–12 season.

History
Hereford Rugby Club was formed in 1870 and a history of the club from its formation until 1989 – two years after the formal start of league rugby – can be found on the club's website.

Honours
 North Midlands Cup winners (3): 1987–88, 1989–90, 1991–92
 Midlands 2 West champions: 1987–88
 Midlands 1 champions (2): 1989–90, 1995–96
 Midlands 3 West (South) champions: 2006–07
 Midlands 2 (east v west) promotion playoff winners: 2008–09

References

External links
 Official club website

English rugby union teams
Rugby clubs established in 1870
Rugby union in Herefordshire
Hereford